Eudonia chrysopetra is a moth in the family Crambidae. It was described by Edward Meyrick in 1929. It is found on the Society Islands, where it has been recorded from Tahiti.

References

Moths described in 1929
Eudonia